In computer humor, a write-only language is a pejorative term for a programming language alleged to have syntax or semantics sufficiently dense and bizarre that any routine of significant size is too difficult to understand by other programmers and cannot be safely edited. Similarly, write-only code is source code so arcane, complex, or ill-structured that it cannot be reliably modified or even comprehended by anyone with the possible exception of the author.

Languages that have been derided as write-only include APL, C/C++, Perl, Forth, Scala and Lisp, as well as Dynamic debugging technique (DDT), Text Editor and Corrector (TECO), Mathematica, IGOR Pro, Rust, sed and the regular expression syntax used in various languages. Attributes that these languages have in common include a large set of operators and a syntax which encourages, or at least permits, the writing of very dense code. Some also have syntaxes which are very different from other languages, and some use different character sets such as APL.

The code below for example is Conway's Game of Life as written in APL2:
⍎'⎕',∊N⍴⊂S←'←⎕←(3=T)∨M∧2=T←⊃+/(V⌽¨⊂M),(V⊖¨⊂M),(V,⌽V)⌽¨(V,V←1 -1)⊖¨⊂M'

See also 
 Esoteric programming language
 International Obfuscated C Code Contest
 Obfuscation (software)
 Spaghetti code
 Turing tarpit
 Write-only memory

References 

Software engineering folklore
Programming language classification